Marek Szabó (born 14 February 1989) is a Slovak football defender who plays for KFC Komárno, on loan from FK Chotín. His former club was the Corgoň Liga club FC Nitra.

External links

FC Nitra profile
Eurofotbal.cz profile

References

1989 births
Living people
Slovak footballers
Association football defenders
FC ŠTK 1914 Šamorín players
MŠK Novohrad Lučenec players
FC Nitra players
Slovak Super Liga players
Nemzeti Bajnokság II players